Nicholas Allan Mangold (born January 13, 1984) is an American former professional football player who was a center for the New York Jets of the National Football League (NFL). He played college football for the Ohio State Buckeyes, and was selected by New York in the first round of the 2006 NFL Draft. Mangold was a seven-time Pro Bowl selection with the Jets, and was considered to be among the best at his position.

High school years
Nick Mangold attended Archbishop Alter High School in Kettering, Ohio, where he was a letterman in football, wrestling, and track & field. In football, he was a three-year starter on both offense and defense and as a senior, he garnered All-Ohio honors. He also earned three letters in wrestling and two in track and field, competing in the shot put.

Mangold went completely unregarded by recruiting services like Rivals.com and Scout.com. Regardless, he played in the 2002 U.S. Army All-American Bowl.

College career
Mangold attended Ohio State University, and was a three-year starter at center for the Ohio State Buckeyes football team. He was rated on a par with former Buckeye All-American and 2001 Rimington Trophy winner LeCharles Bentley by offensive line coach Jim Bollman. "Most guys you get out of high school have to be taught to play center. He already knew the mechanics of the position. That was a big, big advantage," said Bollman. Ohio State's most durable lineman, Mangold logged over 300 minutes of action in each of his last three seasons.

In his true freshman year, Mangold appeared in eight games as backup for Alex Stepanovich. In 2003, Stepanovich suffered a knee injury in the second game of the season vs. San Diego State. Nick Mangold moved in and started the final 11 games of the season. When Stepanovich returned, he shifted to guard while Nick Mangold continued to man the center position.

He earned All-Big Ten Conference Honorable Mention  honors in 2004, when the coaching staff named Nick  Mangold Offensive Lineman of the Week seven times and Offensive Player of the Week vs. Northwestern. Nick  Mangold was again chosen second-team All-Big Ten in 2005. He finished his career with 33 starts in 45 games

Professional career

After a "tremendous performance" at the 2006 Senior Bowl, Mangold was widely regarded as the top center available in the 2006 NFL Draft, ahead of 2005 Outland and Rimington Trophy winner Greg Eslinger.

Nick Mangold was selected in the first round (29th overall) by the New York Jets, who had just prior used their No. 1 pick on offensive tackle D'Brickashaw Ferguson in an effort to rebuild their offensive line. The Jets originally acquired the pick from the Atlanta Falcons in a trade for John Abraham. It marked the first instance of a team drafting two offensive linemen in the first round following the 1975 NFL Draft, when the Los Angeles Rams took Dennis Harrah and Doug France. Mangold was the only center selected in the first round of the 2006 NFL Draft, and the highest pick among Ohio State Buckeye centers since Gordon Appleby went 26th overall in 1945.

Replacing Kevin Mawae at center, Mangold had a good rookie season, allowing only 0.5 sacks, committing only three penalties and making all the line calls. Mangold was considered to be the best prospect at center in the last 15 years according to NFL draft expert Mike Mayock. He was so impressive he garnered some Rookie of the Year talks, an honor that is not usually mentioned about centers. As a rookie in 2006, Mangold started all 16 games at the center position. From 2007 through 2010, Mangold started all 16 games in 4 of those seasons. The Jets made the playoffs twice during the span in the 2009 and 2010 seasons, but lost to the Indianapolis Colts and Pittsburgh Steelers in two AFC Championship games respectively.

Mangold was a Pro Bowl selection in 2008 and 2009, and was part of an offensive line that started the same players for 32 games—the longest active streak among NFL offensive lines at the time—it was regarded as one of the league's best in run blocking. In 2010, Mangold wanted to restructure his contract with the team, however was admittedly disappointed with the pace of the contract talks. On August 24, 2010, Mangold signed a seven-year $55 million contract with $22.5 million guaranteed. By signing this contract, Mangold became the highest paid center in the NFL, but has since been surpassed by Ryan Kalil and Alex Mack.

During Week 2 of the 2011 season against the Jacksonville Jaguars, Mangold left the game with an apparent ankle injury. He was replaced by undrafted rookie Colin Baxter, who would take his position at center as Mangold missed the next two games due to a high ankle sprain. Mangold eventually returned during Week 5 against the Patriots. He finished the 2011 season by starting 14 games and was named a Pro Bowl selection for the fourth time.

In 2012, Mangold started all 16 games, but was not named to the Pro Bowl, as his All-Star years ended after a four-year streak. In 2013, Mangold again started all 16 games and was named to the fifth Pro Bowl of his career.

In the 2014 and 2015 seasons, Mangold started 15 games respectively in both seasons, and was named a Pro Bowl selection in both years, totaling seven times that he was a Pro Bowl selection.

In Week 7 of the 2016 season, Mangold injured his ankle and missed the next four games. He returned in Week 13 against the Colts before re-injuring his ankle. He was placed on injured reserve on December 8, 2016, ending his season.

On February 25, 2017, Mangold was released by the Jets after 11 seasons with the team.  The team was coming off a poor season and entering a rebuilding mode, prompting them to offload Mangold's salary.

On April 17, 2018, after spending the entire 2017 season out of football, Mangold announced his retirement. He signed a one-day contract on April 24, 2018 with New York to officially retire as a Jet.

Legacy
On September 25, 2022 during a halftime ceremony at Metlife Stadium Mangold was inducted into the New York Jets "Ring of Honor".

Personal life
Mangold was born to Vernon and Therese Mangold. Mangold is the oldest of four children as he has three sisters, Kelley, Holley (an Olympic weightlifter), and Maggey. Mangold's sister Holley has achieved a degree of fame and sports success in her own right. She was an offensive lineman for the Alter High School football team. The team was state runner-up in 2006, and won the state championship in 2008 and 2009. In 2011, Holley was featured on an episode of MTV's True Life ("I'm the Big Girl"). Holley Mangold is also a weightlifter in the superheavyweight division. She participated in the 2012 Summer Olympics as a member of the U.S. weightlifting team, coming in 10th place.

Mangold hails from the same hometown as fellow Ohio State alumni Mike Nugent and A. J. Hawk. Mangold and Nugent were later teammates on the New York Jets. Hawk and Nugent were teammates on the Ohio State Buckeyes. Mangold married Jennifer Richmond, his high school sweetheart, in April 2007. The family lived in Chatham, New Jersey during his playing days, but moved to Madison, New Jersey following his retirement from the NFL, where he coaches youth football. Mangold has participated in various charitable events throughout his career.

Mangold appeared on the Wrap Up Show on Howard 100 after the broadcast of the Howard Stern Show on April 30, 2009. He has also campaigned with Republican Presidential candidate Mitt Romney and Donald Trump.

He graduated from Ohio State in May 2019 with a degree in Operations Management.

He appeared virtually on the January 22, 2021 episode of the television game show Let's Make a Deal to help an in-studio contestant win a truck.

References

External links

Official Website
New York Jets bio

1984 births
Living people
Players of American football from Dayton, Ohio
American football centers
Ohio State Buckeyes football players
New York Jets players
American Conference Pro Bowl players
Unconferenced Pro Bowl players